We Are the Dead is Antagonist A.D.'s second full-length album. The title is drawn from a line in the World War I poem "In Flanders Fields".

Before the release of this album they changed their name from Antagonist to Antagonist A.D. to reduce confusion between them and the American metalcore band, Antagonist.

Track listing

References

2008 albums
Antagonist A.D. albums